Killaworgey is a hamlet near Indian Queens in Cornwall, England. It is in the civil parish of St Columb Major.

References

Hamlets in Cornwall